In the United States, a friendly suit or collusive suit is most often used when two parties desire or require judicial recognition of a settlement agreement, and so one sues the other despite the lack of conflict between them.

The law condones this practice because there are several benefits to settling a lawsuit as opposed to settling a claim outside of a lawsuit. First, if one of the parties to the claim is a minor, they usually cannot settle the claim without the appointment of a guardian ad litem to review and accept the settlement. Once the suit is filed, and the settlement is reviewed by the ad litem who considers the best interest of the child, the parties can then file a joint motion for the court to render judgment, which would then be binding on all parties regardless of their minority.  When there is a judgment, the parties also gain the defense of res judicata if sued again on the same topic.

Friendly suits are generally not within the jurisdiction of the federal judiciary of the United States, as they do not constitute a true "case or controversy" under Article III of the United States Constitution; see United States v. Johnson. In practice, however, friendly suits are rarely explicitly described as such, and they could easily slip into the federal judicial system through some casual omissions. Moreover, the "case or controversy" requirement of Article III does not bind the judiciaries of the states, which are free to impose their own restrictions on friendly suits (or none at all).

References

American legal terminology